Tibellus is a genus of slender crab spiders described by Simon in 1875, belonging to the order Araneae, family Philodromidae. Species of this genus are present in Eurasia, Africa, Americas and Australia.

Description
Adult members of this genus can reach  of length and can mostly be encountered above the soil surface (epigeal organism) on low vegetation, foliage or herbaceous plants, where they actively pursue their preys, as they do not make webs. This genus, which includes active hunters, was once considered a subfamily within the sedentary 'crab spiders' (Thomisidae species).

The basic color of the body is light brown or pale yellow. It is elongate and slender (hence the common name), the carapace (prosoma) and the cylindrical abdomen (opisthosoma) show a large brown stripe in the midline of the back. The long and thin legs are more or less equal in length and they usually are stretched out along grass stems or leaves, the first two pairs forwardly directed.

They generally have eight black equal-sized eyes in two horizontal rows of four each, with posterior median ones close to each other.

Species list
 Tibellus affinis O. P.-Cambridge, 1898 — Mexico
 Tibellus armatus Lessert, 1928 — Central, Southern Africa
 Tibellus asiaticus Kulczynski, 1908 — Russia, North America
 Tibellus aspersus Danilov, 1991 — Russia
 Tibellus australis (Simon, 1910) — Botswana
 Tibellus bruneitarsis Lawrence, 1952 — Zimbabwe, South Africa
 Tibellus californicus Schick, 1965 — USA
 Tibellus chamberlini Gertsch, 1933 — USA, Canada
 Tibellus chaturshingi Tikader, 1962 — India
 Tibellus chilensis Mello-Leitão, 1943 — Chile
 Tibellus cobusi Van den Berg & Dippenaar-Schoeman, 1994 — East, Southern Africa
 Tibellus cucurbitus Yang, Zhu & Song, 2005 — China
 Tibellus demangei Jézéquel, 1964 — Ivory Coast, South Africa
 Tibellus duttoni (Hentz, 1847) — USA, Mexico
 Tibellus elongatus Tikader, 1960 — India
 Tibellus fengi Efimik, 1999 — Russia, China, Japan
 Tibellus flavipes Caporiacco, 1939 — East, Southern Africa
 Tibellus gerhardi Van den Berg & Dippenaar-Schoeman, 1994 — East, Southern Africa
 Tibellus hollidayi Lawrence, 1952 — East, Southern Africa
 Tibellus insularis Gertsch, 1933 — Cuba
 Tibellus jabalpurensis Gajbe & Gajbe, 1999 — India
 Tibellus japonicus Efimik, 1999 — Russia, China, Japan
 Tibellus katrajghatus Tikader, 1962 — India
 Tibellus kibonotensis Lessert, 1919 — East, Southern Africa
 Tibellus kimi Seong, 2013 — Korea, Republic of
 Tibellus macellus Simon, 1875 — Europe to Central Asia
 Tibellus macellus georgicus Mcheidze, 1997 — Georgia
 Tibellus maritimus (Menge, 1875) — Holarctic
 Tibellus minor Lessert, 1919 — Africa
 Tibellus nigeriensis Millot, 1942 — Sudan
 Tibellus nimbaensis Van den Berg & Dippenaar-Schoeman, 1994 — Guinea-Bissau
 Tibellus oblongus (Walckenaer, 1802) — Holarctic
 Tibellus oblongus maculatus Caporiacco, 1950 — Italy
 Tibellus orientis Efimik, 1999 — Russia, China
 Tibellus paraguensis Simon, 1897 — Paraguay, Argentina
 Tibellus parallelus (C. L. Koch, 1837) — Palearctic
 Tibellus pashanensis Tikader, 1980 — India
 Tibellus pateli Tikader, 1980 — India
 Tibellus poonaensis Tikader, 1962 — India
 Tibellus propositus Roewer, 1951 — Yarkand
 Tibellus rothi Schick, 1965 — USA
 Tibellus septempunctatus Millot, 1942 — Guinea
 Tibellus seriepunctatus Simon, 1907 — Africa
 Tibellus shikerpurensis Biswas & Raychaudhuri, 2003 — Bangladesh
 Tibellus somaliensis Van den Berg & Dippenaar-Schoeman, 1994 — Somalia, Zimbabwe
 Tibellus spinosus Schiapelli & Gerschman, 1941 — Argentina
 Tibellus sunetae Van den Berg & Dippenaar-Schoeman, 1994 — Southern Africa
 Tibellus tenellus (L. Koch, 1876) — Russia, China to Australia
 Tibellus utotchkini Ponomarev, 2008 — Russia
 Tibellus vitilis Simon, 1906 — India, Sri Lanka
 Tibellus vosseleri Strand, 1906 — Algeria
 Tibellus vossioni Simon, 1884 — Africa
 Tibellus zhui Tang & Song, 1989 — China

References
 A Van den Berg - A revision of the Afrotropical species of the genus Tibellus Simon (Araneae: Philodromidae) - A. S A.S. Dippenaar-Schoeman - Vol 37, No 1 (1994)
 L. Watson and M. J. Dallwitz - The Families of Spiders Represented in the British Isles -  Philodromidae
 Michael J Roberts - The spiders of Great Britain and Ireland

External links
 Bugguide
 Boldsystems

Philodromidae
Araneomorphae genera
Cosmopolitan spiders